Komazec (Комазец) is a Serbian surname. The Komazec family settled in Dalmatia during the Great Serb Migrations. They are traditionally living in the former village of Žegar, which now constitutes Kaštel Žegarski, Bogatnik, Nadvoda and Komazeci (now in Obrovac). At the census in 1991, the village Komazeci had 357 inhabitants who all declared themselves as Serbs. It may refer to:

Dr. Slobodan Komazec, Professor at Belgrade Faculty of Economics
Dr. Gordana Komazec, Professor at Megatrend University
Arijan Komazec (born 1970), Croatian basketball player
Nikola Komazec (born 1987), Serbian football player
 Silvano Komazec (born 1983), Serbian musician from Doboj (BiH), frontman and vocal of rock band Korak 2 (Step two)

Serbian surnames